Erika Mouynes (born 24 November 1977) is a Panamanian politician. She served as Minister of Foreign Affairs from December 2020 to October 2022.

References 

Living people
1977 births
Place of birth missing (living people)
Government ministers of Panama
Foreign Ministers of Panama
Female foreign ministers